Varanasi Mayoral Constituency is one of the 14 mayoral constituencies of Uttar Pradesh.

Total Number of Voters

List of Mayors

Election Results

References
http://www.hindustantimes.com/india/parties-in-do-or-die-mode/story-q0ZO90Q27Hx1ZeXVJ7bAvK.html

http://www.indiatoday.in/story/uttar-pradesh-local-body-elections/1/204299.html

http://www.thehindu.com/todays-paper/tp-national/tp-otherstates/independents-leading-in-uttar-pradesh-local-bodies-elections/article3044521.ece

https://www.oneindia.com/2006/10/20/rajnath-to-address-rally-in-varanasi-on-oct-24-1161349665.html

V